Chaudhary Bilal Asghar Warraich is a Pakistani politician who had been a member of the Provincial Assembly of the Punjab from October 2018 till January 2023.

Early life and education
He was born on 18 September 1977 in Gojra.

As per Punjab Assembly official website, he graduated in 1997 from University of the Punjab and has a degree of Bachelor of Arts. A review by the board of University of Punjab in 2021 found that his bachelor's degree issued in 1997 was fake. The board also stated that they issued summons to hear Warraich's side of the story eight times, but he did not appear.

Political career

He was elected to the Provincial Assembly of the Punjab as a candidate of Pakistan Muslim League (J) (PML-J) from Constituency PP-84 (Toba Tek Singh-I) in 2002 Pakistani general election. He received 24,662 votes and defeated Asad Zaman Cheema, a candidate of Pakistan Muslim League (N) (PML-N).

He was re-elected to the Provincial Assembly of the Punjab as a candidate of Pakistan Muslim League (Q) (PML-Q) from Constituency PP-84 (Toba Tek Singh-I) in 2008 Pakistani general election. He received 35,011 votes and defeated Usman Ali Cheema, a candidate of PML-N.

He was re-elected to the Provincial Assembly of the Punjab as a candidate of Pakistan National Muslim League (PNML) from Constituency PP-84 (Toba Tek Singh-I) in 2013 Pakistani general election. He received 26,501 votes and defeated an independent candidate, Asad Zaman.

He was re-elected to the Provincial Assembly of the Punjab as an independent candidate from Constituency PP-118 (Toba Tek Singh-I) in by-election held on 14 October 2018.

In May 2021 Mr.Warraich became the special coordinator to Chief Minister Punjab for Sports, Local Departments and Youth affairs.

References

Living people
Punjab MPAs 2013–2018
1977 births
Punjab MPAs 2002–2007
Punjab MPAs 2008–2013